Sagarras Bajas is a locality located in the municipality of Tolva, in Huesca province, Aragon, Spain. As of 2020, it has a population of 17.

Geography 
Sagarras Bajas is located 101km east of Huesca.

References

Populated places in the Province of Huesca